Strelka may refer to:

Places
 Strelka (inhabited locality), several inhabited localities in Russia including:
 Strelka, Amur Oblast
 Strelka, Lesosibirsk, Krasnoyarsk Krai
 Strelka, Vologda Oblast
 Strelka, Voronezh Oblast
 a small cape at the confluence of the Volga and Kotorosl Rivers in Yaroslavl, Russia

People
 Andrew Strelka (born 1980), American attorney

Other uses
 Strelka (chess engine), a Russian chess engine
 Strelka (Nizhny Novgorod Metro), a metro station in Nizhny Novgorod, Russia
 Strelka Institute, Moscow
 Strelka, Soviet space dog
 the easternmost tip of Vasilyevsky Island in St. Petersburg, Russia